James Prosek (born May 23, 1975) is an American artist, writer and naturalist. He was born in Connecticut and grew up in the town of Easton, CT where he still lives.  His father was born in Santos, Brazil and his mother in Prague, Czechoslovakia. He  is a 1997 graduate of Yale University.

Career 
Prosek published his first book in 1996 while studying at Yale. Trout: An Illustrated History included watercolors of seventy species, subspecies, and strains of trout in North America. With the publication of Trout, the first book of its kind, Prosek became widely recognized as having brought attention to the existence and plight of native trout, leading to widespread conservation efforts. A year later, in 1997, he published his second book, Joe and Me: An Education in Fishing and Friendship. His second trout book, Trout of the World, published in 2003, is a collection of one hundred watercolors of native trout from Europe, Asia and North Africa (updated and expanded in 2013, Abrams).

Since those early documentary works Prosek’s art has become more conceptual, engaging in questions of how we name, systematize and order nature. His art has been featured in exhibitions at The Asia Society Hong Kong Center, Yale University Art Gallery, Amon Carter Museum of American Art, New-York Historical Society Museum, Florence Griswold Museum, The Philadelphia Museum of Art, The Smithsonian American Art Museum, The Addison Gallery of American Art, North Carolina Museum of Art, the New Britain Museum of American Art, The Yale Center for British Art, The Royal Academy of Arts in London, The Buffalo Bill Center of the West, and The National Academy of Sciences among other institutions.  His first solo museum exhibition,  Life & Death - A Visual Taxonomy, was at the Aldrich Contemporary Art Museum  in Ridgefield, CT in 2007.

He has been an artist-in-residence at numerous institutions including the Yale University Art Gallery, the Isabella Stewart Gardner Museum and the Addison Gallery of American Art.

In 2002, Prosek won a Peabody Award for his documentary on 17th-century author and angler Izaak Walton and his book The Compleat Angler.  As an undergraduate at Yale University he majored in English Literature, and was a member of Manuscript Society. Of his second book Joe and Me his teacher, the literary critic Harold Bloom, wrote “Prosek is a writer at once artful and natural, an original in literature even as he is in painting.”

The art historian Brian T. Allen noted Harold Bloom’s fondness for Prosek and his work. “Bloom called Prosek ‘an original’,” Allen wrote, who considered Prosek "the best artist of [Bloom's] era."

Allen considers Prosek a kind of outsider, comparing him in that sense to the British ceramicist-artist Grayson Perry who hung Prosek’s work in the 250th Royal Academy Summer Exhibition in London. "In art," he writes, "Perry and Prosek don’t just challenge the conventional. They ignore it."

In 2004 Prosek co-founded a conservation initiative with Patagonia founder Yvon Chouinard called "World Trout" which raises money for coldwater habitat conservation.

Since the start of the program in 2005, the World Trout Initiative has given $2 million to over 200 fish conservation groups.

Prosek is the author of eleven books for both adults and children, including Ocean Fishes (Rizzoli, 2012) and The Day My Mother Left (Simon & Schuster, 2006). He has written for the New York Times and National Geographic Magazine.

His book, Eels: An Exploration, From New Zealand to the Sargasso, of the World's Most Mysterious Fish, was released by HarperCollins in September 2011 and was a New York Times Book Review Editor's Choice. The book was adapted as a documentary for the PBS series Nature that aired in 2013.

Notes

External links
 
 James Prosek on NPR All Things Considered
 James Prosek on NPR Speaking of Faith
 National geographic clownfish link

Angling writers
1975 births
Living people
American male writers
Writers from Stamford, Connecticut
People from Easton, Connecticut
Artists from Stamford, Connecticut